The Church of the Seat of Mary (from ), Church of the Kathisma or Old Kathisma being the name mostly used in literature, was a 5th-century Byzantine church in the Holy Land, located between Jerusalem and Bethlehem, on . It was built on the alleged resting place of Mary on the road to Bethlehem mentioned in the Proto-Gospel of James. The church was built when Marian devotion first rose to great importance, following the First Council of Ephesus of 431. It is one of the earliest churches known to have been dedicated to the Theotokos (Mary the God-bearer) in the entire Byzantine Empire.

Discovery
Its remains were discovered accidentally during construction work of Highway 60 in 1992 near Mar Elias Monastery. The course of the highway was shifted to avoid damage to the site, so that the ruins are now just off the road, at the once municipal border between Jerusalem and Bethlehem before 1967. The site was excavated in 1997.

History
Archaeological excavations revealed possible remains of a small shrine from the first half of the 5th century, but mainly a large and lavish octagonal church and its monastery, originally built around 456 by the widow Ikelia, and substantially restored sometime between 531-538.

The southern apse was turned into a mosque in the first half of the 8th century, while the rest of the structure continued to be used as a church. Scholars hold that the church was destroyed during the Persian invasion in 614.

Significance: novelties

New Marian cult
The Kathisma was the earliest church strictly dedicated to Mary in Jerusalem and the surrounding area. It was dedicated to the Theotokos, "Birth Giver of God", much in accordance with the decisions taken at the First Council of Ephesus in regard to Christian dogma in AD 431, and was built under the guidance of the bishop of Jerusalem, Juvenal, a participant in the Ephesus Council.

The church is connected to the introduction of the earliest strictly Marian feast, the celebration of the Theotokos, which was inaugurated by Juvenal at the Kathisma. At first it was set on 15 August, but had to be moved backward by two days, to 13 August, to make place for another Marian feast, the Assumption. The church was built in 456, five years after the Council of Chalcedon, which reaffirmed the decisions from Ephesus and finally granted Juvenal, as the bishop of Jerusalem, ecclesiastical independence, on the same footing with Rome, Constantinople, Alexandria and Antioch.

Candle procession
Ikelia introduced at Kathisma a new custom: a candle procession to mark the purification of the Virgin Mary at the Temple in Jerusalem forty days after the birth of Jesus. This custom then first spread to much of the Eastern Church, and later to the Western Church where it is known as 'Candlemas'.

Description
The building had an octagonal floor plan measuring 43 m x 52 m, comparable to that of the 4th-century Church of the Nativity in Bethlehem and other Byzantine churches, imitated in the construction of the Muslim Dome of the Rock in the late 7th century, with the Kathisma rock in the center. Most of the rooms of the church were paved in coloured mosaics of floral and geometric designs, some of them added in the 8th century.

Ancient sources

De Situ Terrae Sanctae (6th c.)
The 6th-century De Situ Terrae Sanctae claims that the influential Byzantine court official Urbicius had the rock cut into rectangular shape, like an altar, and intended to have it moved to Constantinople, but no-one was able to move it beyond Jerusalem's St Stephen's Gate, so it was placed in the Church of the Resurrection right behind the tomb of Jesus, where it was used for the Eucharist.

Vita of St Theodosius (6th c.)
The church is mentioned in a 6th-century hagiography of Theodosius the Cenobiarch, Vita Theodosii by Cyril of Scythopolis (c. 525 – c. 559). According to this text, both the church and the monastery of Kathisma were built by a wealthy widow called Ikelia (Iqilia, Hicelia) during the reign of bishop Juvenal of Jerusalem (r. 422–458). Theodosius is said to have lived in the monastery as a young monk.

See also
Ramat Rachel, nearby kibbutz, site of a related Byzantine monastery

References

Further reading
 Rina Avner, The Kathisma - a Christian and Muslim pilgrimage site, ARAM 18-19 (2007), pp. 541–57

External links
The Church of the Seat of Mary (Kathisma), Israel Ministry of Foreign Affairs (1999).
Kathisma (biblewalks.com)
Beata Adonia, Kathisma – A place of rest on the way to Bethlehem, The Jerusalem Post 31 January 2013.
Photos of the church site at the Manar al-Athar photo archive

5th-century churches
Archaeological sites in Jerusalem
Shrines to the Virgin Mary
Ancient churches in the Holy Land
Byzantine church buildings
Holy Land during Byzantine rule